XIX Corps was a corps-sized formation of the United States Army, initially allocated to the Organized Reserves in California and seven other western and northwestern states. Meanwhile, the Headquarters, III Armored Corps was formed at Camp Polk, Louisiana on July 7, 1942 under the command of Major General Willis D. Crittenberger during World War II. It was activated on August 20 the same year at Camp Polk. The XIX Corps was officially disbanded on October 1, 1943 from the Organized Reserves. On October 10, 1943, the Headquarters, III Armored Corps was reorganized and re-designated as Headquarters and Headquarters Company, XIX Corps which formed the activated XIX Corps. It fought as part of the First and Ninth Armies, fighting on the Western Front of World War II. Disbanded on 5 September 1945 in France, it was reconstituted on 12 July 1950 in the Army of the United States. It was allotted to the Regular Army in October 1959 and activated on 1 November that year at Fort Chaffee, Arkansas. It was inactivated on 1 April 1968 at Fort Chaffee.

Further reading
 – History of the unit and organization from World War II

References

External links
 www.xixcorps.nl

 https://history.army.mil/catalog/pubs/60/60-7.html

Attribution
:  John B. Wilson, Armies, Corps, Divisions, and Separate Brigades, Washington: GPO, 1999

19
10
Military units and formations established in 1942
Military units and formations disestablished in 1968